= Artem Panasenkov =

Ukrainian footballer

Personal information
- Full name: Artem Andriyovych Panasenkov
- Date of birth: 5 November 1998 (age 28)
- Place of birth: Khmelnytskyi, Ukraine
- Height: 1.74 m (5 ft 9 in)
- Position: Right midfielder

Team information
- Current team: Podillya Khmelnytskyi
- Number: 20

Youth career
- 2012: DYuSSh-1 Khmelnytskyi
- 2012–2013: DVUFK Dnipropetrovsk

Senior career*
Years	Team	Apps	(Gls)
2016	Khlibozavod Nº9 Dnipropetrovsk	4	(0)
2017–2018	Khmelnytskyi	21	(5)
2018–	Podillya Khmelnytskyi	61	(0)
- * Club domestic league appearances and goals as of 22 December 2021

Artem Andriyovych Panasenkov (Ukrainian: Артем Андрійович Панасенков; born 5 November 1998) is a Ukrainian professional footballer who plays as a right midfielder for Ukrainian club Podillya Khmelnytskyi.
